Gareth Swift was a professional rugby league footballer who played in the 2000s. He played at club level for Featherstone Rovers (Heritage № 927).

Club career
Gareth Swift made his début for Featherstone Rovers on Sunday 22 February 2009.

Death
Swift was killed in a road traffic accident in 2010 aged 19.

References

Featherstone Rovers players
Place of birth missing
English rugby league players
Year of birth missing
2010 deaths